SA Airport can refer to:
 San Antonio International Airport
 San Angelo Regional Airport